Leonel Conde (1937 – 2001) was a Uruguayan professional  footballer who played as a goalkeeper in Uruguay, Mexico, Netherlands, and the United States.

Career
Conde played for Cerro and Mexican club Atletico Morelia, before moving to the United States to play with the Oakland Clippers, the Kansas City Spurs, and the Washington Darts. In the 1969 season he was a member of the NASL 1st All-Star Team. He also played in the Netherlands with PEC Zwolle.

References

1937 births
2001 deaths
Uruguayan footballers
C.A. Cerro players
Atlético Morelia players
Oakland Clippers players
Kansas City Spurs players
Washington Darts players
PEC Zwolle players
National Professional Soccer League (1967) players
North American Soccer League (1968–1984) players
Association football goalkeepers
Uruguayan expatriate footballers
Uruguayan expatriate sportspeople in Mexico
Expatriate footballers in Mexico
Uruguayan expatriate sportspeople in the Netherlands
Expatriate footballers in the Netherlands
Uruguayan expatriate sportspeople in the United States
Expatriate soccer players in the United States